Juan José Potous y de la Lastra (ca. 1845 – ca. 1920) was Mayor of Ponce, Puerto Rico, from 12 July 1895 to 10 May 1896.

Mayoral term
Upon the death of mayor Eduardo Armstrong, the governor of Puerto Rico named Juan José Potous, without waiting for the triplet recommendation from the Municipal Council.  His main focus as mayor was to maintain a clean and neat look to the city.  To that effect, he published guidelines for issues as mundane as the painting of the exterior of homes and the construction and installation of yard fences. He also addressed matters related to public health and hygiene.  On 20 January 1896, he instituted detailed procedures for the celebration of wakes in people's homes. His oversaw a municipal government that ran smoothly thanks to his thorough knowledge of public administration.

Potous is best remembered for his relentless interest in completing the construction of Hospital Civil de Ponce (Ponce Civil Hospital), an annex/enlargement to Hospital Tricoche, that had been started in 1885. Many city streets were finished into macadam surfaces under his administration. Ermelindo Salazar, Bartolo Mayol, and Francisco Maria Franceschi were the lead contributors to the new hospital wing. He also engaged in the beautification of the city as well as in advancing the cause of public education.

Resignation
On 23 March 1896, Potous imposed a fine on the director of "La Libertad" newspaper for printing false claims regarding the war that Spain was waging in Cuba. Then the next day the paper printed an editorial attacking Potous. The paper subsequently also printed another editorial titled "El Hombre Lúgubre" (The depressed man) and, knowing it referred to him, Potous had the paper's director jailed and required bail payment of $4000 Spanish pesetas. Given this state of affairs and with a preference of not having to deal with what he considered were unjust attacks on a public servant, Potous took advantage of an offer made to him to become director of the Mayagüez-Lares railroad, presented his resignation to the governor and left Ponce for his new job in western Puerto Rico.

See also
List of Puerto Ricans
List of mayors of Ponce, Puerto Rico

References

Further reading
 Fay Fowlie de Flores. Ponce, Perla del Sur: Una Bibliografía Anotada. Second Edition. 1997. Ponce, Puerto Rico: Universidad de Puerto Rico en Ponce. p. 334. Item 1664. 
 Municipio de Ponce. Ayuntamiento. Informe sobre las necesidades de la ciudad de Ponce que deben tenerse presente al redactar el presupuesto municipal y que se publica por acuerdo del Excmo. Ayuntamiento de esta ciudad. Ponce, Puerto Rico: Imprenta El Vapor. 1895. [fotocopia] (Colegio Universitario Tecnológico de Ponce, CUTPO)
 Fay Fowlie de Flores. Ponce, Perla del Sur: Una Bibliografía Anotada. Segunda Edición. 1997. Ponce, Puerto Rico: Universidad de Puerto Rico en Ponce. p. 337. Item 1676. 
 Ponce. Informe sobre las necesidades de la Ciudad de Ponce que deben tenerse presente al redactar el presupuesto municipal y que se publica por acuerdo del Excm. Ayuntamiento de esta Ciudad. Ponce, Puerto Rico: Imprenta El Vapor. 1895. Archivo Histórico Municipal de Ponce)

Mayors of Ponce, Puerto Rico
1840s births
1920s deaths